Mecaila Irish May Morada (born July 27, 1988) is a Filipino volleyball athlete.

Career
Morada was the UAAP Season 69 - Rookie of the Year. and the Season 71 Best Server. She played for Petron Blaze in the 2015 Asian Club Championship. and for the 2016 PSL Grand Prix Conference with Petron Tri-Activ Spikers

Morada was the team captain for the FEU Lady Spikers in the UAAP Season 74 and Petron Blaze Spikers for the PSL 2015 season.

Clubs
  FEU Lady Spikers (2007-2014)
  Petron Tri-Activ Spikers (2015-2016)
  Cignal HD Spikers (2017)

Awards

Individuals

References

Filipino women's volleyball players
Living people
Far Eastern University alumni
University Athletic Association of the Philippines volleyball players
1988 births
Volleyball players from Metro Manila
Sportspeople from Quezon City
Middle blockers